Roger R Berube (born July 25, 1938) is an American politician in the state of New Hampshire. He was a member of the New Hampshire House of Representatives, sitting as a Democrat from the Strafford 18 district, having been first elected in 1994.

Boards 
Berube served on the Metro Planning Organization, the New Hampshire Canadian Trade Council, the Skyhaven Airport Operating Commission, the Somersworth City Council and the Somersworth School Board.

He was defeated in September 2018 primaries. 

In 2021 his son died of brain cancer.

References

1938 births
Living people
Members of the New Hampshire House of Representatives